MRU Super Cup is the top cup competitions of rugby union in Malaysia.

Introduced in 2004, the MRU Super Cup is contested only to the top four rugby union clubs in the MRU Super League.  The Malaysian Rugby Union (MRU) is handling the cup competition.

Past Finals & Champions

Records

See also

 MRU Super League
 MRU Super League seasons
 National Inter Club Championship

External links
 Malaysian Rugby Union's website

MRU Super Cup
Rugby union cup competitions